Annushka is a Russian agricultural air company based in Shamakova, Russia. They specialise in crop spraying.  Their AOC was revoked in August 2010 but was subsequently restored. In 2008 6 Cessna 188 AgTrucks were added to the fleet. Annushka operates from their own airfield in the Alexandria-St George district of Stavropolskii Krai.

Fleet

References
 

Defunct airlines of Russia
Airlines established in 1993
Airlines disestablished in 2010
Companies based in Stavropol Krai